The Regius Professorship of Greek is a professorship at the University of Oxford in England.

Henry VIII founded the chair by 1541. He established five Regius Professorships in the university (and five corresponding chairs in Cambridge University), the others being the Regius chairs of Divinity, Medicine, Civil Law and Hebrew.

List of holders

 John Harpsfield, ca. 1541–1545
 George Etheridge (or Etherege), 1547–1550
 Giles Lawrence, 1551–1553
 George Etheridge, reinstated, 1553–1559
 Giles Lawrence, reinstated, 1559–1584 or 1585
 John Harmar (or Harmer), 1585–1590
 Henry Cuffe, 1590–1597
 John Perrin, 1597–1615
 John Hales, 1615–1619
 John Harrys, 1619–1622
 John South, 1622–1625
 Henry Stringer, 1625–1650
 John Harmar (or Harmer), 1650–1660
 Joseph Crowther, 1660–1665
 William Levinz, 1665–1698
 Humphrey Hody, 1698–1705
 Thomas Milles, 1705–1707
 Edward Thwaytes, 1707–1711
 Thomas Terry, 1712–1735
 John Fanshawe, 1735–1741
 Thomas Shaw, 1741–1751
 Samuel Dickens, 1751–1763
 William Sharp, 1763–1782
 John Randolph, 1782–1783
 William Jackson, 1783–1811
 Thomas Gaisford, 1811–1855
 Benjamin Jowett, 1855–1893
 Ingram Bywater, 1893–1908
 Gilbert Murray, 1908–1936
 E. R. Dodds, 1936–1960
 Hugh Lloyd-Jones, 1960–1989
 Peter J. Parsons, 1989–2003
 Christopher Pelling, 2003–2015
 Gregory Hutchinson, 2015–present

See also
Regius Professor of Greek (Cambridge)
Regius Professor of Greek (Trinity)
List of Professorships at the University of Oxford

Sources
Oxford Dictionary of National Biography, Oxford University Press, 2004.
R. W. Chambers, "Life and Works of Nicholas Harpsfield", in The life and death of Sr Thomas Moore, knight, sometymes Lord high Chancellor of England, written in the tyme of Queene Marie by Nicholas Harpsfield, L.D., Oxford: EETS O.S. no. 186, 1932, pp. clxxv–ccxiv, esp. pp. clxxviii–clxxx.  Important archival information correcting widely repeated mistaken information about the history of the chair in the 1540s.
The historical register of the University of Oxford: being a supplement to the Oxford University calendar, with an alphabetical record of University honours and distinctions completed to the end of Trinity term 1888, Oxford: Clarendon Press, 1888, p. 49.

Greek, Regius
1541 establishments in England
Greek, Oxford
Greek, Regius, Oxford
Greek, Regius, Oxford
Lists of people associated with the University of Oxford